The Wasps is the fourth in chronological order of the eleven surviving plays by Aristophanes. It was produced at the Lenaia festival in 422 BC, during Athens' short-lived respite from the Peloponnesian War.

As in his other early plays, Aristophanes satirizes the Athenian general and demagogue Cleon. He also ridicules the law courts, one of the institutions that provided Cleon his power. The play has been thought to exemplify Old Comedy.

Plot
The play begins with a strange scene—a large net has been spread over a house, the entry is barricaded and two slaves, Xanthias and Sosias, are sleeping in the street outside. A third man is positioned at the top of an exterior wall with a view into the inner courtyard but he too is asleep. The two slaves wake and we learn from their banter that they are keeping guard over a "monster." The man asleep above them is their master and the monster is his father—he has an unusual disease. Xanthias and Sosias challenge the audience to guess the nature of the disease. Addictions to gambling, drink and good times are suggested but they are all wrong—the father is addicted to the law court: he is a phileliastes or a "trialophile." The man's name is Philocleon (which suggests that he might be addicted to Cleon), and his son's name is the very opposite of this—Bdelycleon. The symptoms of the old man's addiction include irregular sleep, obsessional thinking, paranoia, poor hygiene and hoarding. Counselling, medical treatment and travel have all failed to solve the problem, and now his son has turned the house into a prison to keep the old man away from the law courts.

Bdelycleon wakes and he shouts to the two slaves to be on their guard—his father is moving about. He tells them to watch the drains, for the old man can move like a mouse, but Philocleon surprises them all by emerging instead from the chimney disguised as smoke. Bdelycleon is luckily on hand to push him back inside. Other attempts at escape are also barely defeated. The household settles down for some more sleep and then the Chorus arrives—old jurors who move warily through the muddy roads and are escorted by boys with lamps through the dark. Learning of their old comrade's imprisonment, they leap to his defense and swarm around Bdelycleon and his slaves like wasps. At the end of this fray, Philocleon is still barely in his son's custody and both sides are willing to settle the issue peacefully through debate.

The debate between the Philocleon and Bdelycleon focuses on the advantages that the old man personally derives from voluntary jury service. Philocleon says he enjoys the flattering attentions of rich and powerful men who appeal to him for a favourable verdict, he enjoys the freedom to interpret the law as he pleases since his decisions are not subject to review, and his juror's pay gives him independence and authority within his own household. Bdelycleon responds to these points with the argument that jurors are in fact subject to the demands of petty officials and they get paid less than they deserve—revenues from the empire go mostly into the private treasuries of men like Cleon. These arguments have a paralysing effect on Philocleon. The chorus is won over.

Philocleon refuses to give up his old ways, so Bdelycleon offers to turn the house into a courtroom and to pay him a juror's fee to judge domestic disputes. Philocleon agrees, and a case is soon brought before him—a dispute between the household dogs. One dog (who looks like Cleon) accuses the other dog (who looks like Laches) of stealing a Sicilian cheese and not sharing it. Witnesses for the defense include a bowl, a pestle, a cheese-grater, a brazier and a pot. As these are unable to speak, Bdelycleon says a few words for them on behalf of the accused. A group of puppies (the children of the accused) is ushered in to soften the heart of the old juror with their plaintive cries. Philocleon is not softened, but his son easily fools him into putting his vote into the urn for acquittal. The old juror is deeply shocked by the outcome of the trial—he is used to convictions—but his son promises him a good time and they exit the stage to prepare for some entertainment.

While the actors are offstage, the Chorus addresses the audience in a conventional parabasis. It praises the author for standing up to monsters like Cleon and it chastises the audience for its failure to appreciate the merits of the author's previous play (The Clouds). It praises the older generation, evokes memories of the victory at Marathon, and bitterly deplores the gobbling up of imperial revenues by unworthy men. Father and son then return to the stage, now arguing with each other over the old man's choice of attire. He is addicted to his old juryman's cloak and his old shoes and he is suspicious of the fancy woollen garment and the fashionable Spartan footwear that Bdelycleon wants him to wear that evening to a sophisticated dinner party. The fancy clothes are forced upon him, and he is instructed in the kind of manners and conversation that the other guests will expect of him. At the party, Philocleon declares his reluctance to drink any wine—it causes trouble, he says—but Bdelycleon assures him that sophisticated men of the world can easily talk their way out of trouble, and so they depart optimistically for the evening's entertainment.

There is then a second parabasis (see Note at end of this section), in which the Chorus touches briefly on a conflict between Cleon and the author, after which a household slave arrives with news for the audience about the old man's appalling behaviour at the dinner party: Philocleon has got himself abusively drunk, he has insulted all his son's fashionable friends, and now he is assaulting anyone he meets on the way home. The slave departs as Philocleon arrives, now with aggrieved victims on his heels and a pretty flute girl on his arm. Bdelycleon appears moments later and angrily remonstrates with his father for kidnapping the flute girl from the party. Philocleon pretends that she is in fact a torch. His son isn't fooled and he tries to take the girl back to the party by force but his father knocks him down. Other people with grievances against Philocleon continue to arrive, demanding compensation and threatening legal action. He makes an ironic attempt to talk his way out of trouble like a sophisticated man of the world, but it inflames the situation further. Finally, his alarmed son drags him indoors. The Chorus sings briefly about how difficult it is for men to change their habits and it commends the son for filial devotion, after which the entire cast returns to the stage for some spirited dancing by Philocleon in a contest with the sons of Carcinus.

Note: Some editors (such as Barrett) exchange the second parabasis (lines 1265–91) with the song (lines 1450–73) in which Bdelycleon is commended for filial devotion.

Historical background

Cleon and the Athenian jury system
About two years before the performance of The Wasps, Athens had obtained a significant victory against its rival, Sparta, in the Battle of Sphacteria. Rightly or wrongly, most Athenians credited Cleon with this victory, and he was then at the height of his power. Constitutionally, supreme power lay with the People as voters in the assembly and as jurors in the courts, but they could be manipulated by demagogues skilled in oratory and supported by networks of satellites and informers. Cleon had succeeded Pericles as the dominant speaker in the assembly, and increasingly he could manipulate the courts for political and personal ends, especially in the prosecution of public officials for mismanagement of their duties.

Jurors had to be citizens over the age of thirty and a corps of 6,000 was enrolled at the beginning of each year, forming a conspicuous presence about town in their short brown cloaks, with wooden staves in their hands. The work was voluntary but time-consuming and they were paid a small fee: three obols per day at the time of The Wasps. For many jurors, this was their major source of income and it was virtually an old-age pension. There were no judges to provide juries with legal guidance, and there was no legal appeal against a jury's verdict. Jurors came under the sway of litigious politicians like Cleon who provided them with cases to try and who were influential in persuading the Assembly to keep up their pay. However it is not necessarily true that Cleon was exploiting the system for venal or corrupt reasons, as argued in The Wasps.

Aristophanes' plays promote conservative values and support an honourable peace with Sparta, whereas Cleon was a radical democrat and a leader of the pro-war faction. Misunderstandings were inevitable. Cleon had previously attempted to prosecute Aristophanes for slandering the polis with his second play The Babylonians, and though the legal result of these efforts is unknown, they appear to have sharpened the poet's satirical edge, as evidenced later in the unrelenting attack on Cleon in The Knights. The second parabasis in The Wasps implies that Cleon retaliated for his drubbing in The Knights with yet further efforts to intimidate or prosecute Aristophanes, and the poet may have publicly yielded to this pressure for a short time. Whatever agreement was reached with Cleon, Aristophanes gleefully reneged on it in The Wasps, presenting Cleon as a treacherous dog manipulating a corrupted legal process for personal gain.

Some events that influenced The Wasps
431: The Peloponnesian War commenced.
426: Aristophanes won first prize at the City Dionysia with his second play, The Babylonians (now lost), and he was subsequently prosecuted by Cleon for being the author of slanders against the polis.
425: Athens obtained a significant victory against Sparta in the Battle of Sphacteria and Cleon successfully claimed responsibility for it.
424: Aristophanes won first prize at the Lenaia with The Knights in which he lampooned Cleon mercilessly.
423: Athens and Sparta agreed to a one-year truce. Aristophanes' play The Clouds came third (i.e. last).
422: The Wasps was performed at the Lenaia, winning second place.

Discussion
Some scholars regard The Wasps as one of the greatest comedies in literature. Various factors contribute to its appeal, as for example:
The central figure, Philocleon, is a 'triumph of characterization';
The jurors have been considered the most vividly realized Chorus in Old Comedy;
The juror's son has been viewed as the most lifelike child in Greek drama.
Philocleon is a complex character whose actions have comic significance, psychological significance and allegorical significance. When, for example, he strikes his son for taking the dancing girl away, the violence is comic because it is unexpected of an old man yet it is psychologically appropriate because he is struggling to overcome an addiction and it represents in allegorical form the theme expressed by the Chorus in the parabasis: the old customs are better and more manly than the new fashions. When the play opens, Philocleon is a prisoner of his son and, when the Chorus enters, the old jurors are found to be virtual prisoners of their sons too – they rely on the boys to help them through the dark, muddy streets. The Chorus leader's boy takes full advantage of the situation, threatening to abandon his elderly father if he won't buy him some figs. The debilitating effects of old age and the dehumanizing effects of an addiction (Philocleon is said to resemble a jackdaw, a mouse, a limpet, smoke, a donkey's foal, a cut of meat, Odysseus and Nobody) are somber themes that lift the action beyond the scope of a mere farce.

The Wasps and Old Comedy
The Wasps has been thought to exemplify all the conventions of Old Comedy at their best – structural elements that are common to most of Aristophanes' plays are all found in this play in a complete and readily identifiable form. The table below is based on one scholar's interpretation of the play's structural elements and the poetic meters associated with them.

Miscellaneous

 In 1909, the English composer Ralph Vaughan Williams created popular incidental music for the play – see The Wasps (Vaughan Williams).

Translations
 William James Hickie, 1853 – prose, full text
 Benjamin B. Rogers, 1924 – verse, full text
 Arthur S. Way, 1934 – verse
 Douglass Parker, 1962 – verse
 Alan H. Sommerstein, 1983 – prose and verse
 Unknown translator – prose: full text
 Peter Meineck, 1998 – prose
 George Theodoridis, 2007 – prose: full text
 The Atticist, 2018 – prose and verse with commentary: full text
 Moses Hadas: available for digital loan

References

External links

Plays by Aristophanes
Plays about slavery
Plays set in ancient Greece
Plays set in Athens
Fictional Hymenoptera